Agon is a 2012 Albanian drama film directed by Robert Budina. The film was selected as the Albanian entry for the Best Foreign Language Film at the 86th Academy Awards, but it was not nominated.

Cast
 Marvin Tafaj as Saimir
 Guliem Kotorri as Vini
 Eglantina Cenomeri as Majlinda
 Xhevdet Jashari as Keno (as Dzevdet Jasari)
 Laert Vasili as Beni (as Laertis Vasiliou)
 Antonis Kafetzopoulos as Nikos
 Isavela Kogevina as Elektra (as Isabella Kogevina)
 Hajrie Rondo as Aunt

See also
 List of submissions to the 86th Academy Awards for Best Foreign Language Film
 List of Albanian submissions for the Academy Award for Best Foreign Language Film

References

External links
 

2012 films
2012 drama films
Albanian drama films
Albanian-language films